Kurdo Jalal Omar Abdel Kader (Kurdish: كوردۆ جه‌لال عومه‌ر عه‌بدولقادر, born 30 November 1988) better known by the mononym Kurdo is a German rapper of Iraqi Kurdish origin from Heidelberg, Germany.

Born in Iraq, he immigrated with his family to Germany when he was eight. In 2011, he launched his music through YouTube and was signed by the label Azzlackz. A few months later, he founded his own label Beefhaus with a debut mixtape 11ta Stock Sound and the single "Nike Kappe". In 2014, he released his debut album Slum Dog Millionaer with collaborations with Eko Fresh, KC Rebell, Mosh36, Misel439, Nazar, and Kontra K.
As of 2022 Kurdo has many viral hits with listeners from all over the world from his worldwide famous songs are: "Alles Coco" & "Ya Salam" released in previous years.

On 10 September 2014, Kurdo announced his self-founded label Almaz Musiq that released his second album, Almaz, followed by Verbrecher aus der Wüste in 2016, Vision in 2017, Blanco in 2017, and Miserabel in 2022. He has charted in Germany, Austria and Switzerland.

Discography

Albums

Collaboration albums

Mixtapes

Singles

References

External links
Facebook
Instagram
Twitter
Spotify

German rappers
German people of Iraqi descent
German people of Kurdish descent
1988 births
Living people